Area 52 is a 2012 album by acoustic duo Rodrigo y Gabriela and the Cuban orchestra known as C.U.B.A.  It is Rodrigo y Gabriela's fifth album overall, and their first collaboration with another group. Their aim was to 'do our music with a Cuban orchestra that plays in a very traditional way, a fusion'. All the songs on this album are re-recordings of songs previously released in their previous two studio albums. The duo spent 20 days recording in Cuba where 'the pianist also made the arrangements for the orchestra. We’d play along with the musicians so they could hear our energy'. Afterwards, the band overdubbed solo parts at their own studio.

Track listing

Personnel
Rodrigo y Gabriela
Rodrigo Sánchez - acoustic guitar
Gabriela Quintero - acoustic guitar

C.U.B.A.
Lazaro A. Oviedo Dilou - trumpet
Edouardo J. Sandoval Ferrer - trombone
Cesar Alejandro Lopez Martinez - saxophone
Ariel Sarduy Mena - violin
Anolan Gonzalez Morejon - viola
Feliciano Arango Noa - bass
Irving Roberto Frontelo Rico - violin
Alex Wilson piano, musical director
Otto Santana Selis - cajón, drums, percussion
Jorge Leliebre Sorzano- flute
Juan Kemell Barrera Toledo - trumpet
Rene Suarez Zapata - percussion

Featured Artists
Samuel Folmell Alfonso - drums
John Tempesta - drums
Anoushka Shankar - sitar
Carles Benavent - bass
Carlota Teresa Polledo Noriega - vocals
Le Trio Joubran - oud

Production
Rodrigo Sánchez - production
Peter Asher - production
Rafa Sardina - mixing
Robyn Robins - masterring
Jorge Gabriel "Benny" Benitez Herrera - engineering
Nathaniel Kunkel - engineering
Nicolas Rosemond - engineering
Neil Williams - engineering
Alex Wilson - arrangements
Samantha Lopez - photography
Niall Muckian - photography
Christina Angelina - cover art

References

2012 albums
ATO Records albums
Rodrigo y Gabriela albums
Rubyworks Records albums